The Nepal men's national under-16 basketball team is a national basketball team of Nepal, governed by the Nepal Basketball Association.
It represents the country in international under-16 basketball competitions. Recently, they participated at the 2019 FIBA U16 Asian Championship - SABA Qualifier.

See also
Nepal national basketball team
Nepal men's national under-18 basketball team

References

External links
Profile at Asia-basket.com

Basketball teams in Nepal
Men's national under-16 basketball teams
B